Elmwood—Transcona (formerly Winnipeg—Transcona) is a federal electoral district in Manitoba, Canada, that has been represented in the House of Commons of Canada since 1988. Its population in 2011 was 85,906.

History

The riding was created in 1987 from Winnipeg North Centre and Winnipeg—Birds Hill ridings.

It was previously named Winnipeg—Transcona from 1987 to 2003.

This riding gained territory from Kildonan—St. Paul and a fraction from Saint Boniface during the 2012 electoral redistribution.

Geography

Elmwood–Transcona contains the neighbourhoods of Transcona, South Transcona, Peguis, Regent, Mission Gardens, Melrose, Kildonan Meadows, North Transcona, Kildare Redonda, Kern Park, Canterbury Park, Kildonan Drive, Rossmere, Valley Gardens, Munroe, West Elmwood, Chalmers, Braeside, Talbot Grey, East Elmwood, Mission and Tyne-Tees within the city of Winnipeg. It covers 46 km2.

Members of Parliament

Election results

Winnipeg—Transcona, 1996–2003

Winnipeg—Transcona, 1987–1996

See also
 List of Canadian federal electoral districts
 Past Canadian electoral districts

References

 
 Expenditures - 2008

Notes

Manitoba federal electoral districts
Politics of Winnipeg
Transcona, Winnipeg